Fragments of Bone is the second release from singer Daniel Mustard, the follow-up to his debut EP, Daniel Mustard EP. Funding for the album was acquired from fan donations via a Kickstarter campaign. Like Mustard's first album, Fragments of Bone was produced by James Betruzzi. It was released on September 25, 2012.

Production 
In the summer of 2012, Mustard began a Kickstarter campaign, urging fans to donate money so that he could complete the recording and production of the album. Donors were rewarded, depending on the size of their contribution, with items that included a digital download of the album and Skype lessons and conversations with Mustard and others. His initial goal was $15,000, and around $16,000 was donated.

Track listing 
 "Buyer Best Beware" (Live)
 "The Last Time We Met"
 "Back of my Hand"
 "Same as the Old Me"
 "Vanity Plate"
 "Creep" (Radiohead cover)

2012 EPs
Kickstarter-funded albums